The 1928–29 season was the 29th season of competitive football in Belgium. R Antwerp FC won their first Premier Division title, after a test match they won 2–0 to rival Beerschot AC. The test match was played because both teams ended up the season with the same number of points at the top of the Premier Division.

Overview
At the end of the season, ARA La Gantoise and Tilleur FC were relegated to the Division I, while RFC Brugeois (Division I winner) and SC Anderlechtois were promoted to the Premier Division. The Promotion – the third level in Belgian football – was won by SK Roulers, Charleroi SC and RFC Montegnée. The three clubs were replaced by the 12th, 13th and 14th placed teams in the Division I, i.e. respectively CS Tongrois, Boom FC and AS Renaisien.

National team

* Belgium score given first

Key
 H = Home match
 A = Away match
 N = On neutral ground
 F = Friendly
 o.g. = own goal

Honours

Final league tables

Premier Division

Division I

External links
RSSSF archive – Final tables 1895–2002
Belgian clubs history